"Major Label Debut" is also a song by Broken Social Scene

Major Label Debut is the tenth EP by Chicago punk rock band Screeching Weasel. Despite the name, the E.P. was the first release on Panic Button Records, an independent record label owned by band members Ben Weasel and John Jughead.

A different recording of the song "Nightbreed" would later appear on the band's rarities album Thank You Very Little, while "Racist Society" would later appear on the greatest hits album Weasel Mania.

Track listing
"The Last Janelle" - 0:58
"D.I.Y." - 1:55
"Compact Disc" - 2:01
"Hey Asshole" - 1:16
"Racist Society" - 1:57
"Nightbreed" - 2:16

Personnel
Ben Weasel- vocals
John Jughead- guitar
Zac Damon- guitar, backing vocals
Mass Giorgini- bass
Dan Lumley- drums

References

1998 EPs
Screeching Weasel EPs